The 2003 New York City Marathon was the 34th running of the annual marathon race in New York City, United States, which took place on Sunday, November 2. The men's elite race was won by Kenya's Martin Lel in a time of 2:10:30 hours while the women's race was won in 2:22:31 by Margaret Okayo, also of Kenya.

In the wheelchair races, South Africa's Krige Schabort (1:32:19) and America's Cheri Blauwet (1:59:30) won the men's and women's divisions, respectively. In the handcycle race, Dutchman John Vink (1:33:08) and America's Helene Hines (1:49:13) were the winners.

A total of 34,729 runners finished the race, 23,014 men and 11,715 women.

Results

Men

Women

Wheelchair men

Wheelchair women

Handcycle men

Handcycle women

References

Results
2003 New York Marathon Results. New York Road Runners. Retrieved 2020-05-19.
Results. Association of Road Racing Statisticians. Retrieved 2020-05-19.

External links
New York Road Runners website

2003
New York City
Marathon
New York City Marathon